Matt Hookings (born July 30, 1990) is a Welsh actor, producer, writer, and entrepreneur. He founded Camelot Films in 2013, headquartered in London, United Kingdom.

Early life and education
Hookings was born on July 30, 1990, in Newport, South Wales, to a professional boxer, British Heavyweight Champion, David Pearce and Mary Hookings. He lost his father at the age of 11 and his mother remarried. Hookings studied Film and Drama at the University of Winchester. After completing graduation he moved to London to pursue a career in acting.

Career
Hookings started his career as a stunt performer and worked on films with Angelina Jolie and Tom Cruise. He performed as an action artist in many Hollywood productions including, Maleficent, Edge of Tomorrow, Snow White and the Huntsman, Guardians of the Galaxy (film), and Avengers: Age of Ultron.

Some of Hookings’ notable work in the industry include playing a younger version of Michael Caine. He worked closely with Michael Caine learning his physical traits and mannerisms in his younger days. Hookings played the role of Jem Belcher in the film Prizefighter: The Life of Jem Belcher, which is a true story written by him based on the life incidents of a boxing hero from the early 1800’s. In the film The Grand Duke of Corsica, Hookings plays mystic Catholic friar St. Francis of Assisi alongside Timothy Spall and Peter Stormare. In the film, Winter Ridge he played the role of detective Ryan Barnes for which he received the Best Actor Award at the Hollywood International Film Festival held in Miami.

Awards
 Best Actor Award at the Hollywood International Film Festival.

Filmography

References

Welsh actors
1990 births
Living people